Jnanadabhiram Barua (1880-1955) was a notable Indian Assamese language writer, dramatist, translator, and barrister from Assam. He also participated in India's freedom struggle.

Early life and education
He was born to Gunabhiram Barua and Bishnupriya Devi in 1880. He received his early education in Nagaon. Thereafter he went to Calcutta and London for further education. He became barrister and was appointed as the first principal of BRM Government Law College in Assam.

Literacy works
Some of his works include Venishor Saud, Pancharatna, Dodair poja, and Bialator Sithi (Letters from Abroad). Mor Katha is his autobiographical book. He was the president of the Asam Sahitya Sabha in 1933 held at North Lakhimpur, Assam. He translated Laxminath Bezbarua's Burhi aair xadhu into English.

Personal life
He was married to Latika Tagore. Barua's daughter Ira Barua married Gitindranath Tagore and their eldest daughter is noted Indian film actress Sharmila Tagore.

See also
 Assamese literature
 History of Assamese literature
 List of Asam Sahitya Sabha presidents
 List of Assamese writers with their pen names

References

External links
 Socio-cultural aspects of Assam in the nineteenth century, by Prasenajit Caudhuri (1994)

Dramatists and playwrights from Assam
Asom Sahitya Sabha Presidents
1880 births
People from Nagaon district
1955 deaths
20th-century Indian dramatists and playwrights
20th-century Indian translators
Writers in British India